Mickaël Panos (born 10 February 1997) is a French professional footballer who plays as a defensive midfielder for Liga II side FK Csíkszereda.

Club career
Panos made his professional debut for Saint-Étienne in a 2–0 Ligue 1 win over Monaco on 28 September 2018.

International career
Born in France, Panos is of Greek descent. Panos made one appearance for the France U19s in a 1–1 friendly tie with the Serbia U19s.

Career statistics

Honours 
 Vllaznia Shköder
 Albanian Cup: 2021–22

References

External links
 
 
 
 

1997 births
Living people
Footballers from Essonne
French footballers
France youth international footballers
French people of Greek descent
Association football fullbacks
Ligue 1 players
Championnat National players
Championnat National 2 players
Championnat National 3 players
AS Saint-Étienne players
LB Châteauroux players
Pafos FC players
ESA Linas-Montlhéry players
Liga II players
FK Csíkszereda Miercurea Ciuc players
French expatriate footballers
Expatriate footballers in Romania
French expatriate sportspeople in Romania